The Valley Baseball League is an NCAA and MLB-sanctioned collegiate summer baseball league in the Shenandoah Valley region of Virginia.

The league was started in 1923 and sanctioned by the NCAA in 1961. It has been a wooden bat league since 1993. It is one of almost a dozen leagues in the National Alliance of College Summer Baseball. The VBL is funded in part by a grant from Major League Baseball. The Valley League has produced well over 1,000 professional baseball players, including a record 79 former players drafted in the 2008 Major League Baseball First-Year Player Draft.

In 2007, the Valley Baseball League expanded to include one new team with the addition of the Fauquier Gators. Another team was planned to be added in Lexington, Virginia but difficulties with the lighting system delayed the team's addition to the league. The VBL announced in July 2008 that the Rockbridge Rapids would start play in the 2009 season, but the team folded a couple years later. In 2011 the Strasburg Express entered the league and in 2015 the Charlottesville Tom Sox entered the league.

The league canceled the 2020 season due to the COVID-19 pandemic.

The Culpeper Cavaliers are set to join as the league's 12th team in 2023.

Current teams

Former teams

Season structure 
The regular season consists of 42 games played beginning the Friday after Memorial Day and continuing until late July. Through the 2019 season, teams played all inter-division opponents 3 times and intra-division opponents 5 or 6 times. Beginning in 2021, teams no longer travel to every other ballpark in a single season: rather, all inter-division meetings were scheduled as a single, 7-inning weekend doubleheader. This format was continued in 2022 but with the home teams reversed.

Playoff format
Playoffs begin immediately following the regular season and continue into early August. In all series, the higher seeded team hosts games 1 and 3. No off-days are taken except for rain-outs and while waiting on other series' to finish.

 Division Semifinals
 North Division: #1 vs. #4 (Best 2 of 3 games)
 North Division: #2 vs. #3 (Best 2 of 3 games)
 South Division: #1 vs. #4 (Best 2 of 3 games)
 South Division: #2 vs. #3 (Best 2 of 3 games)

 Division Championship
 North: Highest Remaining Seed vs. Lowest Remaining Seed (Best 2 of 3 games)
 South: Highest Remaining Seed vs. Lowest Remaining Seed (Best 2 of 3 games)

 Championship
 North Division Champion vs. South Division Champion (Best 2 of 3 games)

VBL champions

Championships per team
(in alphabetical order)
 Charlottesville -2
 Covington -2
 Elkton -1
 Front Royal -1
 Haymarket -1
 Harrisonburg -12
 Luray-7
 Madison -2
 New Market -4
 Shenandoah -6
 Staunton -6
 Strasburg -3
 Waynesboro -6
 Winchester -13
Not all teams have been with VBL since 1954. Throughout its history, teams have been removed and added.

The summer of 2008 was highlighted by a promotion called Around the Valley in 60 Days. This promotion was started by Crystal Clear Delivery and S. Carter Studios and encouraged patrons to visit all 11 parks in the 60-day season. The program was deemed a huge success as some fifty fans completed the program and attended all 11 ballparks.

Notable players

Daniel Murphy Luray '04 '05
Brett Gardner, New Market '03 Center Field
Ben Guez, Covington '06
Jason Kipnis, Covington '07, second baseman for the Cleveland Indians
Collin Cowgill, Covington
Javier Lopez, New Market '96
Mike Lowell, Waynesboro '93
Mike Maroth, Staunton '96 '97
Kyle Snyder, Winchester '97
Cory Spangenberg, Winchester '10
Aubrey Huff, Staunton
Luke Scott, Staunton
Juan Pierre, Harrisonburg
Steve Finley, Harrisonburg
Clint Robinson, Harrisonburg '05
Mo Vaughn, Harrisonburg
Jon Rauch, Harrisonburg
David Eckstein, Harrisonburg
Chris Hoiles, Harrisonburg
Chris Devenski, Woodstock
Guido Knudson, Woodstock
Yonder Alonso, Luray '06
Johnny Oates, Waynesboro
Denny Walling, Waynesboro
Wayne Comer, Shenandoah
Jerry May, Staunton
Jon Jay, Staunton '04
Chris Perez, Staunton '04
Ryan Schimpf, Luray '08
Roberto Hernandez, Front Royal
Eddy Rodriguez, Luray '05 & '06
Jim Morris, Charlottesville
Tom Browning, New Market
Dan Pasqua, New Market
Jimmy Key, Winchester
Alex Wimmers, Luray '08
Drew Rucinski, Luray '08
Brian Bocock, Luray '04
Erik Kratz, Waynesboro and Harrisonburg
Mike Cubbage, Charlottesville
Rick Honeycutt, Charlottesville
Billy Sample, Harrisonburg
Kirt Manwaring, Waynesboro
Rich Rodriguez, Staunton
Reggie Sanders, Front Royal
Wayne Tolleson, Staunton
Vic Correll, Staunton
John Kruk, New Market
Sam Perlozzo, Waynesboro and New Market
Jason Michaels, Staunton
John Pawlowski, Staunton
Chad Tracy, Staunton
Tommy La Stella, Haymarket
Darrell Whitmore, Front Royal
Rick Spiers, Charlotte

Conor Miller, Woodstock River Bandits ‘19, ‘21

References

External links
Valley Baseball League

Summer baseball leagues
College baseball leagues in the United States
Baseball leagues in Virginia
Sports leagues established in 1923
1923 establishments in Virginia